is a Japanese volleyball player. He competed in the men's tournament at the 1988 Summer Olympics.

References

1963 births
Living people
Japanese men's volleyball players
Olympic volleyball players of Japan
Volleyball players at the 1988 Summer Olympics
Sportspeople from Hiroshima
20th-century Japanese people